Legion of Gold is a 1981 role-playing game adventure for Gamma World published by TSR.

Plot summary
Legion of Gold is an adventure that deals with a mysterious army of golden, glowing warriors ravaging the countryside around the Great Lake Mitchigoom.

Reception
William A. Barton reviewed Legion of Gold in The Space Gamer No. 41. Barton commented that "Legion of Gold is a worthy effort and can easily stand with the best of TSR's D&D modules. It should make Gamma World fans more excited about the game and may even draw some who have been less enthusiastic to give it a try as well."

References

Gamma World
Role-playing game supplements introduced in 1981
Science fiction role-playing game adventures